Beyond Race Magazine (BRM) is a quarterly magazine based in New York City primarily centered on independent and emerging artists, covering music, film, and other arts, such as literature,  graffiti, tattooing, and visual arts.  The publication also reports heavily on progressive issues and culture, in general.

Founded in 2006 by David Terra, the magazine has steadily grown both in circulation and visibility.

Along with in-depth features on musicians and artists, each issue also covers social and political topics and has several pages devoted to album reviews.  Past issues have covered Dub Trio, the Beastie Boys, Cevin Soling, Garland Jeffreys, Donnell Rawlings, Hi-Tek, Subatomic Sound System, and Nada Surf.

The magazine has been an active supporter of New York City's diverse arts and music scene.  Every year Beyond Race magazine hosts a party for their Music Issue that highlights artists from across the broad spectrum of genres flourishing in the five boroughs from electronic to reggae to hip hop to rock and everything in between. Past bills have included a breadth of artists from Garland Jeffreys to Subatomic Sound System.

The magazine also has a large presence on the internet by maintaining active YouTube and MySpace accounts and regularly updating its website to include exclusive online content, such as interviews, concert and film reviews, and opinion columns.

References

External links

Music magazines published in the United States
Visual arts magazines published in the United States
Quarterly magazines published in the United States
Political magazines published in the United States
Magazines established in 2006
Magazines published in New York City